Chris Hines (born September 19, 1987) is an American professional basketball player who last played for the Atlanta Aliens of the American Basketball Association (ABA). He played college basketball for the University of Alabama.

Early life
Hines was put up for adoption when he was six days old. His father, Patrick Nelson, died when he was 5 years old.  After his adopted mother, Lois Hines, died when Hines was 10, he bounced around from home to home, living with relatives in Montgomery and Evergreen. He later found basketball which became his passion and hobby, keeping him off the streets and out of trouble.

High school career
Hines attended Hillcrest-Evergreen High School in Evergreen, Alabama. As a junior in 2004–05, he averaged 26 points and 8.5 rebounds per game. As a senior in 2005–06, he averaged 25 points, 12 rebounds and 2.5 blocks per game as he led Hillcrest-Evergreen to the 2006 Alabama Class 4A State Championship. He was the 2006 Alabama Class 4A Player of the Year, as well as the Most Valuable Player of the 2006 Alabama Class 4A State Tournament. He also earned Alabama Sports Writers Association's 2006 Alabama All-State "Super Five" Team honors and was runner-up for Alabama's Mr. Basketball honor. In 2006–07, he spent a prep year at North Atlanta Prep in Atlanta, Georgia.

College career
Due to a low ACT score, Hines was unable to qualify academically for a Division I school and thus enrolled at Southwestern Illinois College. In his freshman season at SWIC, he averaged 14 points and nine rebounds, earning all-region and all-conference accolades as the team finished as the region runner-up with a 28–5 record for head coach Jay Harrington.

Prior to his sophomore season, Hines committed to the University of Alabama in October 2008. In his sophomore season at SWIC, averaged 20 points and 12 rebounds per game that season to help his squad to a 35–4 record. He was a first-team junior college All-American in 2009 after leading Southwestern Illinois Community College to the NJCAA National Tournament and the Region 24 title.

As a junior for Alabama in 2009–10, Hines appeared in all 32 games and started the final 14 games of the season. He averaged 3.7 points, 4.2 rebounds and 1.0 steals per game and was subsequently named the teams' Most Improved Player. As a senior in 2010–11, he averaged 5.5 points, 6.1 rebounds, 1.3 assists, 1.5 steals and 1.5 blocks in 37 games (36 starts).

Professional career
Hines went undrafted in the 2011 NBA draft. In October 2011, he signed with Zalakeramia-ZTE KK of Hungary for the 2011–12 season. He later left Zalakeramia in January 2012 after appearing in 10 games.

In the summer of 2013, Hines joined the Atlanta Aliens for the 2013–14 ABA season. On January 1, 2014, he departed Atlanta and left for China. After a trial run in China, he signed with the Plymouth Raiders for the rest of the 2013–14 British Basketball League season on January 17, 2014. He later left Plymouth in late February after appearing in five games where he averaged 9.0 points, 7.8 rebounds and 1.0 steals per game.

In October 2014, Hines re-joined the Atlanta Aliens for the 2014–15 season.

References

External links
Alabama Crimson Tide bio
Eurobasket.com profile

1987 births
Living people
Alabama Crimson Tide men's basketball players
American expatriate basketball people in Hungary
American expatriate basketball people in the United Kingdom
American men's basketball players
Forwards (basketball)
Junior college men's basketball players in the United States
People from Evergreen, Alabama
Plymouth Raiders players
Southwestern Illinois College alumni
ZTE KK players
Basketball players from Alabama
American expatriate sportspeople in England
American adoptees
African-American basketball players
African-American sportsmen